Yoon Ga-eun (born February 15, 1982) is a South Korean film director and script writer. Her films explore the stories of young children and youth.

Career 
Yoon Ga-eun graduated from the History Department of Sogang University and continued her graduate studies at the School of Film, TV & Multimedia at Korea National University of Arts.

Her first film as a director was a 19-minute short film, The Taste of Salvia, introduced in 2009. Shortly afterwards, she directed several films including Proof (2010), Guest (2011), Sprout (2013), Tabloid Truth (2014) and The World of Us (2015).

Her first breakthrough film was Guest (2011), a movie perceptively capturing a phase of the growing pains that a pubescent high school girl experiences. This film won the grand prize from the 34th Clermont-Ferrand International Short Film Festival in 2012.

Sprout (2013) is an adventure story of a little girl who has been left alone for the first time. Yoon expressed the small change that a little girl faces through the steps of discoveries. After Yoon finished Sprout, she stated that she thought that people would strive all the time to achieve their goal, but there are things that they cannot achieve, no matter how hard they try. She dissolved the meaningful process into Sprout.

Yoon is also known for finding new actresses. The Korean actress Jung Yeon-ju started her career with Guest (2011), also Kim Su-an was cast by Yoon. Kim was invited to the Festival de Cannes as the youngest actress ever.

Filmography

Feature films

Short films

Accolades 
Source:

 2019 Hong Kong Asian Film Festival (2019) - New Talent Award (The House of Us)
2017 53rd Baeksang Arts Awards - Best Screenplay (The World of Us)
2017 8th KOFRA Film Awards - Best Independent Film (The World of Us)
2016 Zlín Film Festival- International Film Festival for Children - International competition of feature films for children - The Golden Slipper (The World of Us)
2016 Blue Dragon Film Awards - Best New Director (The World of Us)
2016 25th Buil Film Awards - Best New Director (The World of Us)
2016 Berlin International Film Festival - Generation (The World of Us)
2016 TIFF Kids International Film Festival - TIFF KIDS (The World of Us)
2016 Udine Far East Film Festival - Competition Section - SOUTH KOREA (The World of Us)
2016 Zlín Film Festival- International Film Festival for Children (2016) - International competition of feature films for children - City of Zlín Award - for Best Child Actor in Feature Film for Children (The World of Us)
2016 Toronto Korean Film Festival - Opening Night Feature Presentation (The World of Us)
2016 Busan International Film Festival - Korean Cinema Today-Panorama (The World of Us)
2016 Tokyo Filmex - Competition films (The World of Us)
2016 International Film Festival of India - Country Focus - Republic Of Korea (The World of Us)
2016 Shanghai International Film Festival - Panorama - Korean Films2 (The World of Us)
2014 Busan International Short Film Festival : BISFF (Sprout)
2014 Berlin International Film Festival - Generation - Crystal Bear for the Best Short Film (Sprout)
2014 Aspen Shortsfest - International Competition (Sprout)
2014 Busan International Short Film Festival : BISFF (Sprout)
2014 SEOUL International Women’s Film Festival (2014) - Asian Short Film & Video Competition (Sprout)
2013 Prague Short Film Festival - Panorama (Guest)
2013 Flickerfest International Short Film Festival - Competition Section (Guest)
2013 Busan International Film Festival - Wide Angle: Korean Short Film Competition - Sonje Award Special (Sprout)

Jury member
 2022 — Jury member, Sonje Award at 27th Busan International Film Festival.

Ambassadorship 
 Unobstructed Film Ambassadors (2023)

References

South Korean film directors
South Korean women film directors
South Korean screenwriters
1982 births
Living people
Sogang University alumni
Korea National University of Arts alumni